In four-dimensional Euclidean geometry, the truncated 24-cell honeycomb is a uniform space-filling honeycomb. It can be seen as a truncation of the regular 24-cell honeycomb, containing tesseract and truncated 24-cell cells.

It has a uniform alternation, called the snub 24-cell honeycomb. It is a snub from the  construction. This truncated 24-cell has Schläfli symbol t{31,1,1,1}, and its snub is represented as s{31,1,1,1}.

Alternate names 
 Truncated icositetrachoric tetracomb
 Truncated icositetrachoric honeycomb
 Cantitruncated 16-cell honeycomb
 Bicantitruncated tesseractic honeycomb

Symmetry constructions 

There are five different symmetry constructions of this tessellation. Each symmetry can be represented by different arrangements of colored truncated 24-cell facets. In all cases, four truncated 24-cells, and one tesseract meet at each vertex, but the vertex figures have different symmetry generators.

See also 
Regular and uniform honeycombs in 4-space:
Tesseractic honeycomb
16-cell honeycomb
24-cell honeycomb
Rectified 24-cell honeycomb
Snub 24-cell honeycomb
5-cell honeycomb
Truncated 5-cell honeycomb
Omnitruncated 5-cell honeycomb

References 
 Coxeter, H.S.M. Regular Polytopes, (3rd edition, 1973), Dover edition,  p. 296, Table II: Regular honeycombs
 Kaleidoscopes: Selected Writings of H. S. M. Coxeter, edited by F. Arthur Sherk, Peter McMullen, Anthony C. Thompson, Asia Ivic Weiss, Wiley-Interscience Publication, 1995,  
 (Paper 24) H.S.M. Coxeter, Regular and Semi-Regular Polytopes III, [Math. Zeit. 200 (1988) 3-45]
 George Olshevsky, Uniform Panoploid Tetracombs, Manuscript (2006) (Complete list of 11 convex uniform tilings, 28 convex uniform honeycombs, and 143 convex uniform tetracombs) Model 99
  o4x3x3x4o, x3x3x *b3x4o, x3x3x *b3x *b3x, o3o3o4x3x, x3x3x4o3o - ticot - O99

5-polytopes
Honeycombs (geometry)
Truncated tilings